Kosñipata District is one of six districts of the province Paucartambo in Peru.

Geography 
Other mountains are listed below:

Ethnic groups 
The people in the district are mainly indigenous citizens of Quechua descent. Quechua is the language which the majority of the population (%) learnt to speak in childhood, % of the residents started speaking using the Spanish language (2007 Peru Census).

Subdistrict
Kosñipata Subdistrict (Kosñipata)

Canton
Pillcopata Canton (Pillcopata)
Bernardo Canton  (Bernardo, San Lou, Tarn Loku)

References